Luigi Scaccianoce (July 12, 1914, in Venice, Italy – October 18, 1981) was an Italian production designer, art director and set decorator. He was nominated for an Academy Award for Best Art Direction for his work in The Gospel According to St. Matthew (1964).

Selected filmography
 The Temptress (1952)
 The Wanderers (1956)
 Eva (1962)
 The Gospel According to Matthew (1964)
 The Hawks and the Sparrows (1966)
 Oedipus Rex (1967)

External links

Italian production designers
Italian art directors
Italian set decorators
1914 births
1981 deaths
Film people from Venice